Mount Saint Macrina is the site of the largest pilgrimage among Ruthenian Byzantine Catholics in North America. It is also home to the monastery of Byzantine Catholic Order of Sisters of St. Basil.

History
Established in 1933 by Mother Macrina Melnychuk (1879-1948) near Uniontown, Pennsylvania, the pilgrimage takes place each Labor Day weekend on the grounds of the Basilian monastery there, drawing more than 30,000. Mount Saint Macrina, named for Saint Basil's sister, Saint Macrina, was formally dedicated in 1934.

Once named Oak Hill, it was the estate (more than 1,000 acres) of coal baron J.V. Thompson (Josiah Van Kirk Thompson), a leading figure in the great coal and coke boom of the late 19th century. Financial misfortune forced him into bankruptcy, and in 1933 the Byzantine Catholic Order of Sisters of St. Basil acquired the property. The Thompson mansion, visible from U.S. Route 40, is now the Sisters' retreat center.

The monastery for the community of sisters is a five-story yellow brick building at the north end of the property. An international Order, other groups of the Sisters of St. Basil are spread throughout the world. The newest building on the property is Mount Macrina Manor Nursing Home, dedicated in 1971. Today, the Thompson Mansion serves as a retreat center.

Brothers of Prayers previously held their weekly prayer gathering on the Mount Saint Macrina grounds originally in the Trinity Center and eventually the House of Prayer chapel. The Brothers have moved to St. Thérèse de Lisieux Church, 61 Mill Street, Uniontown, PA. Tuesday evenings from 7:00 to 8:15 PM EST.

In 1999, the Department of the Interior named Mount Saint Macrina to the National Register of Historic Places under its old name of "Oak Hill Estate."

Burials
Basil Takach, in the cemetery of Mount Saint Macrina Monastery
Stephen Kocisko, in the cemetery of Mount Saint Macrina Monastery
Thomas Dolinay, in the cemetery of Mount Saint Macrina Monastery
Basil Schott
George Kuzma
Albert N Skomra - who lived nearby and loved to go for a run on the grounds- is now buried there

References

Further reading

External links
Reverend Mother M. Macrina Melnychuk, O.S.B.M. - The Carpathian Connection
Mount Saint Macrina website
Byzantine Catholic Archeparchy of Pittsburgh website

Christianity in Pittsburgh
Eastern Catholicism in Pennsylvania
Houses on the National Register of Historic Places in Pennsylvania
Neoclassical architecture in Pennsylvania
Houses in Fayette County, Pennsylvania
National Register of Historic Places in Fayette County, Pennsylvania